The 2011 Nigerian Senate election in Ogun State was held on April 9, 2011, to elect members of the Nigerian Senate to represent Ogun State. Olugbenga Onaolapo Obadara representing Ogun Central, Sefiu Adegbenga Kaka representing Ogun East and Akin Babalola Kamar Odunsi representing Ogun West all won on the platform of Action Congress of Nigeria.

Overview

Summary

Results

Ogun Central 
Action Congress of Nigeria candidate Olugbenga Onaolapo Obadara won the election, defeating other party candidates.

Ogun East 
Action Congress of Nigeria candidate Sefiu Adegbenga Kaka won the election, defeating other party candidates.

Ogun West 
Action Congress of Nigeria candidate Akin Babalola Kamar Odunsi won the election, defeating party candidates.

References 

Ogun State Senate elections
Ogun State senatorial elections
Ogun State senatorial elections